Neuland (German for new land) may refer to:


Places
Neuland, Hamburg, quarter in the German city of Hamburg
Neuland Lighthouse, lighthouse in Schleswig-Holstein, Germany; on the coast of Baltic Sea
Neuland Colony, Mennonite settlement in Paraguay

People
Alfred Neuland (1895–1966), Estonian weightlifter
Fritz Neuland (1889–1969), Jewish German lawyer and politician
Wilhelm Neuland (1806–1889), composer and conductor

Entertainment
The New Land (1924 film), a 1924 German silent film starring Otto Gebühr
Neuland, an episode of the PBS series POV by Anna Thomen

Other uses
Das Neuland, anti-religious magazine in German published in the USSR
Neuland, typeface
Operation Neuland, 1942 German submarine offensive in the Caribbean Sea
The Internet, referencing a 2013 statement of Angela Merkel calling the internet "uncharted territory"

See also
Newland (disambiguation)
Newlands (disambiguation)